Croatia competed at the 2022 World Aquatics Championships in Budapest, Hungary from 18 June to 3 July.

Artistic swimming 

Croatia entered 2 artistic swimmers.

Women

Open water swimming

Croatia entered 1 open water swimmer 

Men

Swimming

Croatia entered 1 swimmer.

Women

Water polo 

Summary

Men's tournament

Team roster

Group play

Playoffs

Quarterfinals

Semifinals

Third place game

References

Nations at the 2022 World Aquatics Championships
2022
World Aquatics Championships